An abstract is a brief summary of a research article, thesis, review, conference proceeding, or any in-depth analysis of a particular subject and is often used to help the reader quickly ascertain the paper's purpose. When used, an abstract always appears at the beginning of a manuscript or typescript, acting as the point-of-entry for any given academic paper or patent application.  Abstracting and indexing services for various academic disciplines are aimed at compiling a body of literature for that particular subject.

The terms précis or synopsis are used in some publications to refer to the same thing that other publications might call an "abstract". In management reports, an executive summary usually contains more information (and often more sensitive information) than the abstract does.

Purpose and limitations
Academic literature uses the abstract to succinctly communicate complex research. An abstract may act as a stand-alone entity instead of a full paper. As such, an abstract is used by many organizations as the basis for selecting research that is proposed for presentation in the form of a poster, platform/oral presentation or workshop presentation at an academic conference. Most bibliographic databases only index abstracts rather than providing the entire text of the paper. Full texts of scientific papers must often be purchased because of copyright and/or publisher fees and therefore the abstract is a significant selling point for the reprint or electronic form of the full text.

The abstract can convey the main results and conclusions of a scientific article but the full text article must be consulted for details of the methodology, the full experimental results, and a critical discussion of the interpretations and conclusions.

An abstract allows one to sift through copious numbers of papers for ones in which the researcher can have more confidence that they will be relevant to their research. Once papers are chosen based on the abstract, they must be read carefully to be evaluated for relevance. It is generally agreed that one must not base reference citations on the abstract alone, but the content of an entire paper.

According to the results of a study published in PLOS Medicine, the "exaggerated and inappropriate coverage of research findings in the news media" is ultimately related to inaccurately reporting or over-interpreting research results in many abstract conclusions. A study published in JAMA concluded that "inconsistencies in data between abstract and body and reporting of data and other information solely in the abstract are relatively common and that a simple educational intervention directed to the author is ineffective in reducing that frequency." Other "studies comparing the accuracy of information reported in a journal abstract with that reported in the text of the full publication have found claims that are inconsistent with, or missing from, the body of the full article."

History 
The history of abstracting dates back to the point when it was felt necessary to summarise the content of documents in order to make the information contained in them more accessible. In Mesopotamia during the early second millennium BCE, clay envelopes designed to protect enclosed cuneiform documents from tampering were inscribed either with the full text of the document or a summary. In the Greco-Roman world, many texts were abstracted: summaries of non-fiction works were known as epitomes, and in many cases the only information about works which have not survived to modernity comes from their epitomes which have survived. Similarly, the text of many ancient Greek and Roman plays commenced with a hypothesis which summed up the play's plot. Non-literary documents were also abstracted: the Tebtunis papyri found in the Ancient Egyptian town of Tebtunis contain abstracts of legal documents. During the Middle Ages, the pages of scholarly texts contained summaries of their contents as marginalia, as did some manuscripts of the Code of Justinian.

The use of abstracts to summarise science originates in the early 1800s, when the secretary of the Royal Society would record brief summaries of talks into the minutes of each meeting, which were referred to as 'abstracts'. The Royal Society abstracts from 1800 – 1837 were later collated and published in the society's journal Philosophical Transactions, with the first group appearing in 1832. These abstracts were generally one or more pages long. Other learned societies adopted similar practices. The Royal Astronomical Society (RAS) may have been the first to publish its abstracts: the Monthly Notices of the RAS launched in 1827, containing (among other things) abstracts of talks given at their monthly meetings; the full papers were published months or years later in the Memoirs of the RAS. The RAS abstracts were between one and three paragraphs long. In both cases, these early abstracts were written by the learned society, not the author of the paper. Perhaps the earliest example of an abstract published alongside the paper it summarises was the 1919 paper On the Irregularities of Motion of the Foucault Pendulum published in the Physical Review of the American Physical Society, which often published abstracts thereafter.

Copyright 
Abstracts are protected under copyright law just as any other form of written speech is protected. However, publishers of scientific articles invariably make abstracts freely available, even when the article itself is not. For example, articles in the biomedical literature are available publicly from MEDLINE which is accessible through PubMed.

Structure
Abstract is often expected to tell a complete story of the paper, as for most readers, abstract is the only part of the paper that will be read. It should allow the reader to give an Elevator pitch of the full paper.

An academic abstract typically outlines four elements relevant to the completed work:
 The research focus (statement of the problem(s)/specific gap in existing research/research issue(s) addressed);
 The research methods (experimental research, case studies,  questionnaires, etc) used to solve the problem;
 The major results/findings of the research; and
 The main conclusions and recommendations (i.e., how the work answers the proposed research problem).
It may also contain brief references, although some publications' standard style omits references from the abstract, reserving them for the article body (which, by definition, treats the same topics but in more depth).

Abstract length varies by discipline and publisher requirements. Typical length ranges from 100 to 500 words, but very rarely more than a page and occasionally just a few words. An abstract may or may not have the section title of "abstract" explicitly listed as an antecedent to content. Abstracts are typically sectioned logically as an overview of what appears in the paper, with any of the following subheadings: Background, Introduction, Objectives, Methods, Results, Conclusions. Abstracts in which these subheadings are explicitly given are often called structured abstracts. Abstracts that comprise one paragraph (no explicit subheadings) are often called unstructured abstracts.

Example
Example taken from the Journal of Biology, Volume 3, Issue 2.:
The hydrodynamics of dolphin draftingby Daniel Weihs, Faculty of Aerospace Engineering, Technion, Israel Institute of Technology, Haifa 32000, Israel.

Abstract:

Background
Drafting in cetaceans is defined as the transfer of forces between individuals without actual physical contact between them. This behavior has long been surmised to explain how young dolphin calves keep up with their rapidly moving mothers. It has recently been observed that a significant number of calves become permanently separated from their mothers during chases by tuna vessels. A study of the hydrodynamics of drafting, initiated inmechanisms causing the separation of mothers and calves during fishing-related activities, is reported here.

Results
Quantitative results are shown for the forces and moments around a pair of unequally sized dolphin-like slender bodies. These include two major effects. First, the so-called Bernoulli suction, which stems from the fact that the local pressure drops in areas of high speed, results in an attractive force between mother and calf. Second is the displacement effect, in which the motion of the mother causes the water in front to move forwards and radially outwards, and water behind the body to move forwards to replace the animal's mass. Thus, the calf can gain a 'free ride' in the forward-moving areas. Utilizing these effects, the neonate can gain up to 90% of the thrust needed to move alongside the mother at speeds of up to 2.4 m/s. A comparison with observations of eastern spinner dolphins (Stenella longirostris) is presented, showing savings of up to 60% in the thrust that calves require if they are to keep up with their mothers.

Conclusions
A theoretical analysis, backed by observations of free-swimming dolphin schools, indicates that hydrodynamic interactions with mothers play an important role in enabling dolphin calves to keep up with rapidly moving adult school members.

© 2004 Weihs; licensee BioMed Central Ltd. This is an Open Access article: verbatim copying and redistribution of this article are permitted in all media for any purpose, provided this notice is preserved along with the article's original URL

Abstract types

Informative
The informative abstract, also known as the complete abstract, is a compendious summary of a paper's substance and its background, purpose, methodology, results, and conclusion. Usually between 100 and 200 words, the informative abstract summarizes the paper's structure, its major topics and key points. A format for scientific short reports that is similar to an informative abstract has been proposed in recent years. Informative abstracts may be viewed as standalone documents.

Descriptive
The descriptive abstract, also known as the limited abstract or the indicative abstract, provides a description of what the paper covers without delving into its substance. A descriptive abstract is akin to a table of contents in paragraph form.

Graphical abstracts

During the late 2000s, due to the influence of computer storage and retrieval systems such as the Internet, some scientific publications, primarily those published by Elsevier, started including graphical abstracts alongside the text abstracts. The graphic is intended to summarize or be an exemplar for the main thrust of the article. It is not intended to be as exhaustive a summary as the text abstract, rather it is supposed to indicate the type, scope, and technical coverage of the article at a glance. The use of graphical abstracts has been generally well received by the scientific community. Moreover, some journals also include video abstracts and animated abstracts made by the authors to easily explain their papers. Many scientific publishers currently encourage authors to supplement their articles with graphical abstracts, in the hope that such a convenient visual summary will facilitate readers with a clearer outline of papers that are of interest and will result in improved overall visibility of the respective publication. However, the validity of this assumption has not been thoroughly studied, and a recent study statistically comparing publications with or without graphical abstracts with regard to several output parameters reflecting visibility failed to demonstrate an effectiveness of graphical abstracts for attracting attention to scientific publications.

Abstract quality assessment 
Various methods can be used to evaluate abstract quality, e.g. rating by readers, checklists (not necessary in structured abstracts), and readability measures (such as Flesch Reading Ease).

See also 

 Abstract (law)
 Abstract management
 Academic conference
 Annotation
 Executive summary
 Fast abstract
 IMRAD – commonly used structure for academic journal articles and their abstracts
 List of academic databases and search engines
 Preface
 TL;DR

References

Further reading

 ISO 214: Documentation — Abstracts for publications and documentation. 

Academic publishing
Academic terminology
Publishing